The 2003 Rugby World Cup was the fifth Rugby World Cup and was won by England. Originally planned to be co-hosted by Australia and New Zealand, all games were shifted to Australia following a contractual dispute over ground signage rights between the New Zealand Rugby Union and Rugby World Cup Limited. The pre-event favourites were England, regarded by many at the time as the best team in the world. New Zealand, France, South Africa and defending champions Australia were also expected to make strong showings, with New Zealand being second favourites after victory in the southern-hemisphere Tri-Nations championship.

The tournament began with host nation Australia defeating Argentina 24–8 at Stadium Australia in Sydney. Australia went on to defeat New Zealand 22–10 in the semi-final, to play England in the final. Along with a try to Jason Robinson, Jonny Wilkinson kicked four penalties and then a drop-goal in extra time to win the game 20–17 for England, who became the first northern hemisphere team to win the Webb Ellis Cup.

Qualifying

The following 20 teams, shown by region, qualified for the 2003 Rugby World Cup. Of the 20 teams, eight of those places were automatically filled by the teams that reached the quarter-final stages in 1999, including hosts and world champions Australia and did not have to play any qualification matches. A record 81 nations from five continents were involved in the qualification process designed to fill the remaining 12 spots, which began on 23 September 2000.

Host

Australia won the right to host the 2003 World Cup without the involvement of New Zealand after a contractual dispute over ground signage rights between the New Zealand Rugby Football Union and Rugby World Cup Limited. Australia and New Zealand had been expected to co-host – with New Zealand expected to host 23 of the 48 matches – but New Zealand's insistence on amending the provisions relating to stadium advertising was unacceptable to the IRB.

Venues

The overall stadium capacity was 421,311 across 11 venues. This was a reduction from the 1999 Rugby World Cup in Wales (with games also held in England, France, Ireland, Northern Ireland and Scotland) which had a total capacity of 654,677 across 18 venues.

The Adelaide Oval underwent a AU$20 million redevelopment for the 2003 Rugby World Cup, financed entirely by the South Australian Cricket Association, with two new grandstands built adjacent to the Victor Richardson Gates. Suncorp Stadium in Brisbane (formerly Lang Park) was a new A$280 million venue designed specifically for rugby league, rugby union and soccer, and was opened just prior to the start of the 2003 World Cup with a capacity of 52,500, some 12,000 more than the old Lang Park could hold. The Central Coast Stadium was also a newly built rectangular venue built for union, league and soccer. It was built on the site of the old Grahame Park ground and was opened in February 2000 at a cost of A$30 million.

The Sydney Football Stadium was one of two venues in Sydney that were used for football during the 2000 Olympic Games. The other venue in Sydney was Stadium Australia, which was the centrepiece of the 2000 Olympic Games. It was built as the main stadium of the 2000 Olympics at a cost of $690 million and with a capacity of 83,500 was the biggest stadium used in the 2003 World Cup (the stadium had an original capacity of 110,000 before undergoing a post-Olympics redevelopment from 2001 to 2003). The only stadium with a retractable roof used was the Docklands Stadium in Melbourne. Although the Docklands Stadium has movable seating which brings four sections of the lower bowl forward by 18 metres to create a more rectangular surround for the pitch, this was not used during the World Cup as it reduces the seating capacity of the stadium by approximately 3,500.

Squads

Referees

  Pablo Deluca
  Andrew Cole
  Stuart Dickinson
  Scott Young
  Peter Marshall
  Chris White
  Tony Spreadbury
  Joël Jutge
  Alain Rolland
  David McHugh
  Paul Honiss
  Paddy O'Brien
  Steve Walsh
  Jonathan Kaplan
  André Watson
  Nigel Williams

Touch judges and television match officials

  Joël Dumé
  Donal Courtney
  Alan Lewis
  Giulio de Santis
  Kelvin Deaker
  Iain Ramage
  Mark Lawrence
  Nigel Whitehouse

Pools and format

Following criticism of the complex format used in the 1999 Rugby World Cup a new simpler format was introduced and the twenty teams were divided into four pools of five nations, with the top two in each pool moving on to the knock-out quarter-final stage. With forty matches to be played in the pool stage on top of the knock-out matches would make the event the largest Rugby World Cup tournament to be played to date. For the first time, a bonus point system was implemented in pool play. This system is identical to that long used in Southern Hemisphere tournaments, and was soon adopted in most European competitions (though not in the Six Nations until 2017):
4 points for a win
2 points for a draw
0 points for a loss (before possible bonus points)
1 bonus point for scoring 4 or more tries, or a loss by 7 points or fewer

A total of 48 matches (40 pool stage and eight knock-out) were played throughout the tournament over 42 days from 10 October to 22 November 2003.

Summary

Pool stage

The Australian media criticised the competition early in the tournament as the smaller nations were crushed by the rugby superpowers by 60 points or more, in particular a 142–0 victory by the host nation over Namibia, the largest winning margin in Rugby World Cup history. However, some of these smaller, third-tier nations, such as Japan, acquitted themselves well in their opening matches. The South Pacific island countries of Fiji, Tonga and Samoa were reported as being handicapped by several of their foreign-based key players being warned by their clubs that their contracts would not be renewed if they played in the competition.

The pool stage of the competition played out largely as expected, with some tension as to whether some of the "developing" nations would overtake some of the weaker major countries for the second quarter-final qualification place in each pool – in Pool A, Argentina lost to Ireland by only one point, when a victory would have carried them into the quarter-finals in Ireland's place; in Pool B, Fiji narrowly missed out on a quarter-final berth, having led Scotland 20–15 with five minutes to go in their deciding match, only for a yellow card to lock Apenisa Naevo to allow Scotland to snatch victory from the jaws of defeat with a late converted try; in Pool D, Italy, despite missing the knockout stage, put up a good performance with two victories, a record they matched in the next three World Cups. In Pool C, Samoa gave England a fright with an adventurous approach that allowed them to take an early lead, but England overcame the early deficit and eventually won. This match was marked by controversy, as England fielded 16 players at one point during the game.

The big clashes ran mainly to form. South Africa came through the pool in second place, after they lost to England, which meant a quarter-final against New Zealand. Australia, however, only beat Ireland by one point to top their pool, while Wales pushed the All Blacks to the wire in arguably the most entertaining game of the entire tournament; adopting a hyper-attacking style of play, they led 37–33 with just 20 minutes left, but New Zealand eventually proved too much in the 12-try thriller. France meanwhile routed Scotland to set up a quarter-final against Ireland.

Knockout stage
The quarter-final stage produced the widely predicted set of semi-finalists, although England again made heavy weather of defeating a resurgent Wales. England were widely rated the world's best team, but they struggled, at least in the first half, against a Welsh side full of belief after their game against New Zealand. However, spurred into action after the tactical substitution of Catt for Luger and by a Will Greenwood try, set up by a remarkable run by Jason Robinson from inside his own half, England pulled away in the second half, until a late Welsh try gave the scoreline the respectability that their first-half performance had deserved. France destroyed an Irish side who had gone into the match hopeful of a win, scoring 31 early points to put the game out of reach. In the other quarter-finals, a disappointing South Africa fell to a clinical New Zealand and Australia comprehensively defeated the Scots.

The first semi-final produced the first significant upset of the tournament, when Australia defeated the fancied New Zealand to become the first defending champions to reach the following championship final. Unfortunately, it was the last match for Australian star Ben Darwin, who badly injured his neck in a scrum. Although Darwin never played rugby again, the actions of Kees Meeuws – who immediately stopped exerting pressure when he heard the call "neck neck neck" – may well have saved his opponent's life and certainly prevented further injury. The match was decided by a Stirling Mortlock interception try, after a loose pass from highly rated All Blacks fly-half Carlos Spencer, and the excellent kicking of inside-centre Elton Flatley. George Gregan taunted his opponents in defeat with the comment, "Four more years boys, four more years".

The second semi-final saw France face England. The boot of Jonny Wilkinson was the difference between the two sides, with England coming out victors in torrential rain: although France scored the game's only try after an early English line-out error, they never seriously threatened the English line otherwise. With handling and place-kicking being so difficult in the wet and windy conditions (both Wilkinson and Michalak missed three kicks at goal each), England's superior forward pressure and territorial control forced France to concede a slew of penalties, of which Wilkinson kicked five, also adding three drop goals (two off his less-favoured right boot) - a remarkable display considering that the swirling winds made accurate kicking as difficult as the rain and mud made passing and running. French ill-discipline also cost them dear, with winger Christophe Dominici and flanker Serge Betsen both receiving yellow-cards for foul play: the former for a cynical trip on Jason Robinson, the latter for a late tackle on Wilkinson.

New Zealand played France in the third-place playoff, and New Zealand avenged their shock defeat to France in the semi-finals at the 1999 World Cup, running in 6 tries in a 40-13 demolition. Mils Muliaina and Doug Howlett scored a try a-piece, finishing as the tournament's joint-leading try-scorers with 7 tries.

Final

The final between Australia and England was played at Sydney's Stadium Australia in front of a crowd of 82,957, and was refereed by veteran South African official André Watson, in so doing becoming the first, and so far only, referee to officiate two Rugby World Cup finals. Australia opened the scoring after they decided to run a penalty instead of kicking for touch. Lote Tuqiri beat England's right wing, Jason Robinson, to a high cross-field kick and went over for the first try, but Elton Flatley was not able to add the conversion.

The rest of the half was a tight affair, with England edging in front from applying pressure and Jonny Wilkinson's boot put them up to a 9–5 lead after Australian indiscipline gave away several penalties, but were unable to capitalise on their territory. Towards the end of the first half, England stretched their lead further. Lawrence Dallaglio made a break and popped the ball inside to Jonny Wilkinson, who drew the defence before putting Robinson away in the corner for a try. The conversion was missed, but England went in at half time leading by 14–5.

In the second half Australia tightened their discipline, and solid play forced mistakes from England. The game swung from end to end, with both sides having try-scoring opportunities, but neither able to take them. Australia managed to get points on the board and Elton Flatley scored two penalties to make the score 14–11 to England. In the 79th minute, Australia were putting pressure on England in their half, and Australia were awarded a penalty right before full-time, with the potential to tie the scores. Flatley converted it to make the score 14–14 and take the game into an additional 20 minutes' extra time.

England opened the scoring in extra time with another Wilkinson penalty, but with two and a half minutes of extra time remaining Australia were awarded another penalty, which Flatley kicked successfully. With 20 seconds left before sudden death, Wilkinson scored a drop goal to win the match and with it the world championship.

Post-final
After the final, Australian Prime Minister John Howard was widely criticised for his behaviour during the presentation ceremony. The offhand manner in which he presented the Webb Ellis Cup to the England captain was seen by many as a graceless piece of bad sportsmanship not befitting such a climactic sporting spectacle.

Three days after the final, the World Cup winning England team landed at Heathrow Airport in the early hours of the morning, emerging from their plane to a huge reception, despite the time. On 8 December, a national day of celebration took place in the form of a massive victory parade in the streets of London.

Pool stage

Pool A

Largest winning margin in Rugby World Cup history.

Pool B

Andy Miller's drop goal, at 52 metres, remains the longest in Rugby World Cup history.

Pool C

Pool D

Knockout stage

Quarter-finals

Semi-finals

Third-place play-off

Final

Statistics

The tournament's top point scorer was England's Jonny Wilkinson, who scored 113 points. Doug Howlett and Mils Muliaina scored the most tries, seven in total.

Broadcasters
The event was broadcast by Seven Network and Fox Sports in Australia and by ITV in the United Kingdom.

References

External links

2003 Rugby World Cup Official site (Archived)
2003 Rugby World Cup Reports and Statistics
BBC account of 2003 World Cup victory
Tournament Results & Statistics on ESPN Scrum

 
Rugby World Cup tournaments
World Cup
October 2003 sports events
November 2003 sports events
2003 in Australian rugby union